Mozhdeh (also known as Muzhde) is a village in Belesbeneh Rural District, Kuchesfahan District, Rasht County, Gilan Province, Iran. At the 2006 census, its population was 1,677, in 429 families.

References 

Populated places in Rasht County